The Liberian Bank for Development and Investment (LBDI) is a Liberian national development bank that has since 1988 also acted as a commercial bank.  It is headquartered in Monrovia and was established by the Liberian government and a number of foreign development companies to help develop the financial infrastructure in Liberia.

History
It was created by an Act of the National Legislature in 1961 under the joint initiative of the Liberian government and major international financial institutions who purchased equity in the Bank, namely: International Finance Corporation, Commonwealth Development Corporation, Capital Partners, European Investment Bank, the Agence française de développement, and Deutsche Investitions-und Entwicklungesllchaft, over 150 private Liberians, other international and local institutions. Foreign shareholding is 44.47% and local shareholding is 55.53%.

LBDI is predominantly a privately owned institution under private management and a Board of Directors elected annually by its Shareholders. The Bank commenced operations in 1965 as Liberian Bank for Industrial Development and Investment. 

Under an amendment in 1974, the name was changed to the Liberian Bank for Development and Investment (LBDI). A further amendment in 1988 allowed the Bank to engage in commercial banking activities, to complement its development objectives.

References

External links
Liberian Bank for Development and Investment web site

Economy of Liberia
Banks of Liberia
Banks established in 1961